Köçərli (also, Kuçərli and Kyucharli) is a village and municipality in the Tartar Rayon of Azerbaijan.  It has a population of 1,528.

References 

Populated places in Tartar District